Crisis Cell was a Pakistani talk show hosted by Sana Bucha that aired on Geo News. The show covered a variety of topics relevant to Pakistanis.

Format
A panel of renowned personalities, including diplomats, UN ambassadors, and intellectuals from various fields, were featured as guests to discuss and explore pressing issues and suggest possible practical solutions. Live reports were also a part of the show.

See also
 GEO News

External links
Home page

Television news in Pakistan
Geo News